Olaf James Fink (March 15, 1914 – March 26, 1973) was a Louisiana educator and politician who served as a Democrat in the Louisiana State Senate from 1956 to 1972.

Born in Algiers, New Orleans, Fink received a B.A. from Spring Hill College in Mobile, Alabama, followed by an M.A. from Loyola University in New Orleans. After a lengthy high school teaching career, he served in the state senate for sixteen years. The Olaf Fink Center for Pre-Vocational Education in New Orleans was named for him in 1974, the year after his death, and existed until it was sold by the local government in 2011.

References

1914 births
1973 deaths
Democratic Party Louisiana state senators
Politicians from New Orleans
Educators from Louisiana
Spring Hill College alumni
Loyola University New Orleans alumni
United States Navy officers
Burials in Louisiana
20th-century American politicians